Julián Edgardo Román Rey (born November 23, 1977) is a Colombian actor, has been involved in theater, film and television.

Biography 
His father, José Edgardo Román (1950–2022), played Mario Arboleda, the equivalent of Mike Ehremantraut, in the Spanish-language Colombian remake of Breaking Bad, titled Metástasis. Julian was born in Bogota. He began his very young training through ongoing workshops at the district school drama Luis Enrique Osorio, and then continued drama studies, use of space and body language in popular theater in Bógota TPB with renowned teachers such as Adelaida Nieto, Carolina Vivas, Ignacio Rodriguez and Rosario Jaramillo, as well as the theatrical art research laboratory "Take Action" of his father the actor Edgardo Román.

Filmography

Film roles

Television roles

Awards and nominations

References

External links 
 

20th-century Colombian male actors
1977 births
Living people
21st-century Colombian male actors
Male actors from Bogotá
Colombian male film actors
Colombian male stage actors
Colombian male television actors